Salado River or Río Salado may refer to:

Rivers

Argentina 
 Salado River (Argentina), a tributary of the Paraná River
 Salado River (Buenos Aires), starts at the El Chañar lagoon and runs 650 kilometres to Samborombón Bay
 Salado River (La Rioja), in Catamarca Province and La Rioja Province
 Desaguadero River, a tributary of the Colorado River

Chile 
 Salado River (Antofagasta)

Cuba 
 Salado River (Cuba)

Mexico 
 Rio Salado (Mexico), a tributary of the Rio Grande (Río Bravo)
 Salado River (Oaxaca)

Paraguay 
 Salado River (Paraguay)

United States 
 Salt River (Arizona)
 Rio Salado (New Mexico), a tributary of the Rio Grande

Other uses 
 Rio Salado Brewing Company, Tempe, Arizona
 Rio Salado College, Tempe, Arizona
 El Malah, formerly Rio Salado, a municipality in Algeria

See also
 Salado (disambiguation)
 Saline River (disambiguation)